The Falcons Intelligence Cell of Iraq (Arabic: خلية الصقور الاستخبارية) is a military intelligence unit with law-enforcement officers, intelligence officers, and others in specialized intelligence capacities. The Falcons Intelligence Cell has been dubbed "the most dangerous spy network" in Iraq and is trained by the CIA and the MI6, and have carried out hundreds of successful operations against militants, rivaling other Iraqi intelligence services in Iraq in terms of scope and prowess. 

Officials stated that the Falcons are responsible for foiling hundreds of attacks on important cities in Iraq during the 2013-2017 War.

History 
In 2006, the intelligence unit was created with the mission of eliminating leaders of hostile groups. The unit was named "Al-Suquor", or "The Falcons." The unit is most known for operations involving Captain Harith al-Sudani, in which Falcons foiled around 30 car-bomb attacks on Baghdad. The Falcons were praised by U.S. services for infiltrating ISIS cells, killing or arresting leaders and members, preventing attacks and destroying weapons. According to The New York Times, the Iraqi counter-terrorism intelligence unit "May be the most important organization on the front lines of the war on terrorism that almost no one has heard of."

Terrorism infiltration 
The Falcons counter-terrorism operations typically involved Captain Harith al-Sudani infiltrating ISIS during the War in Iraq 2013-2017, driving ISIS's car bombs to important cities, letting the Falcon bomb disposal team dismantle the bombs and replacing them with pyrotechnic devices, and then dropping the car at the target point. There, Falcons would create a fake car bombing, including Falcons agents posing as victims, and photos and fake security briefs sent to news organizations. Captain Al-Sudani would then be picked up by ISIS agents and return with them, continuing his infiltration mission.

Al-Sudani was described as "Iraq’s most successful spy" while operating within the Falcons unit.

Notable people 
Harith al-Sudani (1981–August 2017)

References 

 Michael Knights, Baghdad bombing spurs major intelligence and military reshuffle
 

Iraqi intelligence agencies
2013 establishments in Iraq
Organizations established in 2013
Counterterrorist organizations